National Security Study Memorandum 200: Implications of Worldwide Population Growth for U.S. Security and Overseas Interests (NSSM200), also known as the "Kissinger Report", was a national security directive completed on December 10, 1974 by the United States National Security Council under the direction of Henry Kissinger following initial orders from President of the United States Richard Nixon.

NSSM200 was reworked and adopted as official United States policy through NSDM 314 by President Gerald Ford on November 26, 1975. It was initially classified for over a decade but was obtained by researchers in the early 1990s. The memorandum and subsequent policies developed from the report were observed as a way the United States could use human population control to limit the political power of undeveloped nations, ensure the easy extraction of foreign natural resources, prevent young anti-establishment individuals from being born and to protect American businesses abroad from interference from nations seeking to support their growing populations.

Background 

Under the administration of President Richard Nixon during the Cold War, his government adopted an agenda of enforcing human population control in order to prevent the global spread of communism and under the advice of major general William Henry Draper Jr., supported the creation of the United Nations Population Fund (UNFPA) in order to establish a global source of population control to avoid an image of imperialism. Believing that future generations birthed throughout the world posed a danger to wealth accumulation, wealthy individuals and the US government backed a policy of global population control in an effort to avoid blame. 

As a result, the NSSM200 was drafted primarily by Philander Claxton and concluded that global population control was necessary to protect US economic and military interests. The plan was created to avoid an appearance of "economic or racial imperialism" and "not be seen ... as an industrialized country policy to keep their strength down or reserve resources for use by the rich countries", with a written goal of "fertility reduction and not improvement in the lives of people" despite instructing organizers to "emphasize development and improvements in the quality of life of the poor", later explaining such projects were "primarily for other reasons".

Contents 
The basic thesis of the memorandum was that population growth in the least developed countries (LDCs) is a concern to US national security, because it would tend to risk civil unrest and political instability in countries that had a high potential for economic development. The policy gives "paramount importance" to population control measures and the promotion of contraception among 13 populous countries to control rapid population growth which the US deems inimical to the socio-political and economic growth of these countries and to the national interests of the United States since the "U.S. economy will require large and increasing amounts of minerals from abroad" and the countries can produce destabilizing opposition forces against the US.

In summary, the NSSM200 provides four main observations:

 Population growth of foreign nations provides more geopolitical power and possible opposition to US interests
 The United States relies on countries being underdeveloped in order to easily obtain natural resources
 High birth rates result with more younger individuals who oppose established governments
 American businesses are vulnerable to interference by foreign governments that are required to provide for growing populations

It recommends that US leadership "influence national leaders" and that "improved world-wide support for population-related efforts should be sought through increased emphasis on mass media and other population education and motivation programs by the UN, USIA, and USAID."

Named countries 
Thirteen countries are named in the report as particularly problematic with respect to US security interests: India, Bangladesh, Pakistan, Indonesia, Thailand, the Philippines, Turkey, Nigeria, Egypt, Ethiopia, Mexico, Colombia, and Brazil. The countries are projected to create 47 percent of all world population growth.

It also raises the question of whether the US should consider preferential allocation of surplus food supplies to states deemed constructive in use of population control measures.

General oversight 
The paper takes a look at worldwide demographic population trends as projected in 1974.

It is well divided into two major sections: an analytical section and policy recommendations.

The policy recommendations is divided into two sections. A US population strategy and action to create conditions for fertility decline. A major concern reiterated in the paper concerns the effect of population on starvation and famine.

"Growing populations will have a serious impact on the need for food especially in the poorest, fastest growing LDCs.[least developed countries] While under normal weather conditions and assuming food production growth in line with recent trends, total world agricultural production could expand faster than population, there will nevertheless be serious problems in food distribution and financing, making shortages, even at today's poor nutrition levels, probable in many of the larger more populous LDC regions. Even today 10 to 20 million people die each year due, directly or indirectly, to malnutrition. Even more serious is the consequence of major crop failures which are likely to occur from time to time.

"The most serious consequence for the short and middle term is the possibility of massive famines in certain parts of the world, especially the poorest regions. World needs for food rise by 2.5 percent or more per year (making a modest allowance for improved diets and nutrition) at a time when readily available fertilizer and well-watered land is already largely being utilized. Therefore, additions to food production must come mainly from higher yields.

"Countries with large population growth cannot afford constantly growing imports, but for them to raise food output steadily by 2 to 4 percent over the next generation or two is a formidable challenge."

Key insights 
"The U.S. economy will require large and increasing amounts of minerals from abroad, especially from less developed countries [see National Commission on Materials Policy, Towards a National Materials Policy: Basic Data and Issues, April 1972]. That fact gives the U.S. enhanced interest in the political, economic, and social stability of the supplying countries. Wherever a lessening of population pressures through reduced birth rates can increase the prospects for such stability, population policy becomes relevant to resource supplies and to the economic interests of the United States.... The location of known reserves of higher grade ores of most minerals favors increasing dependence of all industrialized regions on imports from less developed countries. The real problems of mineral supplies lie, not in basic physical sufficiency, but in the politico-economic issues of access, terms for exploration and exploitation, and division of the benefits among producers, consumers, and host country governments" [Chapter III, "Minerals and Fuel"].
"Whether through government action, labor conflicts, sabotage, or civil disturbance, the smooth flow of needed materials will be jeopardized. Although population pressure is obviously not the only factor involved, these types of frustrations are much less likely under conditions of slow or zero population growth" [Chapter III, "Minerals and Fuel"].
"Populations with a high proportion of growth. The young people, who are in much higher proportions in many LDCs, are likely to be more volatile, unstable, prone to extremes, alienation and violence than an older population. These young people can more readily be persuaded to attack the legal institutions of the government or real property of the 'establishment,' 'imperialists,' multinational corporations, or other -- often foreign -- influences blamed for their troubles" [Chapter V, "Implications of Population Pressures for National Security"].
"We must take care that our activities should not give the appearance to the LDCs of an industrialized country policy directed against the LDCs. Caution must be taken that in any approaches in this field we support in the LDCs are ones we can support within this country. "Third World" leaders should be in the forefront and obtain the credit for successful programs. In this context it is important to demonstrate to LDC leaders that such family planning programs have worked and can work within a reasonable period of time." [Chapter I, "World Demographic Trends"]
"In these sensitive relations, however, it is important in style as well as substance to avoid the appearance of coercion."
Abortion as a geopolitical strategy is mentioned several dozen times in the report with suggestive implications: "No country has reduced its population growth without resorting to abortion.... under developing country conditions foresight methods not only are frequently unavailable but often fail because of ignorance, lack of preparation, misuse and non-use. Because of these latter conditions, increasing numbers of women in the developing world have been resorting to abortion....
Population control and population reduction tactics.

Effects 
Marshall Green was named Coordinator of Population Affairs on December 3, 1975. Days later on December 15, 1975, US ambassadors were ordered implement the policies of NSDM 314 and to assess population growth concerns in their host nations. The policies adopted from NSSM200 and NSDM 314 developed even further in 1976 after the National Security Council advocated for the use of withholding food through food power and using military force to prevent population growth, with a memorandum reading; "In some cases, strong direction has involved incentives such as payment to acceptors for sterilization, or disincentives such as giving low priorities in the allocation of housing or schooling to those with larger families. Such direction is the sine qua non of an effective program". This resulted in proposing to foreign nations the creation of money-for-sterlization, housing-for-sterilzation or schooling-for-sterilization projects. 

The Economic Warfare School (EGE) said that the memorandum resulted with the United States using population control policies as a weapon of economic warfare against Nigeria by utilizing social blackmail to force sterilizations and utilizing food power as a means of mitigating population growth. The EGE writes that Nigeria went from approaching potential nuclear capability to a less-developed country, with the United States being able to establish control of Nigeria's resources and maintain the interests of Americans businesses there.

According to the Subcommittee of Inquiry of Voluntary Surgical Contraception of the Congress of the Republic of Peru in June 2002, NSSM200 was "the global strategy defined for the last quarter of the last century by the United States government in order to obtain a decrease in the birth rate" and was responsible for the involvement of the United States Agency for International Development (USAID) in forced sterilizations in Peru.

References

External links 
 

 

 

 

Foreign relations of the United States
Reports of the United States government
United States National Security Council
Presidency of Gerald Ford
Memoranda
1974 in the United States
Population ecology
World population